This is a list of sweet breads. Sweet bread, also referred to as pan dulce, buns or coffee bread, is a  bread or cake that is typically sweet in flavor. Some sweet breads, such as Portuguese Pao Douce, may be prepared with potato flour, which imparts a sweet flavor and light texture to them. Some sweet breads that originated as cake-breads, such as lardy cake, Bath buns and Chelsea buns, are classified as sweet breads in contemporary culinary taxonomy, even though some still have the word "cake" in them.

Sweet breads

A
 
  bread

B

C

 
 
 Challah – Jewish honey egg bread

D

 
  – in Denmark, these types of pastries are referred to as wienerbrød

E

F

G

  – Armenian pastry or sweet bread

H

I

K

  – Hungarian sweet bread
 
 
 
  – dates to the start of the 13th century as a unique bread served at Polish weddings

L

M

P

R
 
  – Mexican sweet bread prepared in a crown shape

S

 
 
 
 
 
 
 
 
 
  – originally from Germany and traditionally served at Christmas

T

V

W

See also

 List of baked goods
 List of bread rolls
 List of breads
 List of buns
 List of pastries
 List of quick breads
 Lists of prepared foods
 List of toast dishes
 Mexican breads

References

Further reading

 

 
Sweet Breads
Sweet